Quzluy-e Sofla, also known as Qowzlu-ye Pain may refer to:
 Quzluy-e Sofla, Mahabad
 Quzluy-e Sofla, Shahin Dezh